The 59th Annual Tony Awards ceremony was held on June 5, 2005 at Radio City Music Hall and broadcast by CBS television. Hugh Jackman hosted for the third time in a row.

This was the first year the craft category awards (costume, scenic, lighting) were divided into plays and musicals.

The ceremony
For the opening number Bernadette Peters sang "Another Op’nin’ Another Show" from Kiss Me, Kate, which was followed by a video montage of the musicals that opened during the 2004-2005 season, as well as short excerpts of those performing that evening. In other special performances, Hugh Jackman sang and danced in a tribute to songs about dancing and Aretha Franklin and Hugh Jackman performed a duet of "Somewhere" from West Side Story.

Laura Linney gave a tribute to the late Arthur Miller and Jesse L. Martin and the cast of Chicago performed "Razzle Dazzle" in memory of Jerry Orbach and Fred Ebb.

The award presenters included: Angela Bassett, Matthew Broderick, Don Cheadle, Sally Field, Harvey Fierstein, Anne Hathaway, Nathan Lane, Sandra Oh, James Earl Jones, Bernadette Peters, and Chita Rivera.

Performances
New musicals

 Dirty Rotten Scoundrels: Norbert Leo Butz, John Lithgow and members of the company performed "Great Big Stuff".
 The Light in the Piazza: Victoria Clark and Kelli O'Hara with Matthew Morrison and members of the company performed "Statues and Stories".
 The 25th Annual Putnam County Spelling Bee: The company, joined by Al Sharpton, performed the title song and "Prayer of the Comfort Counselor."
 Monty Python's Spamalot: Sara Ramirez and Tim Curry with the voice of John Cleese performed "Find Your Grail" with the company.

Revivals

 Sweet Charity: The company did a medley from the show. The female chorus performed "Hey, Big Spender" and Christina Applegate performed 'If My Friends Could See Me Now' and 'I'm a Brass Band'
 La Cage aux Folles: Gary Beach and the company performed the title song.

Winners and nominees
The nominees were announced on May 10, 2005 by Alan Cumming, Lynn Redgrave, Kate Burton and Brian Stokes Mitchell. Monty Python's Spamalot received 14 nominations, the most of any production at the time, followed by Dirty Rotten Scoundrels and The Light in the Piazza with 11 nominations each.

Source:Playbill

Winners are in bold

Special Tony Awards
Best Special Theatrical Event
 Billy Crystal 700 Sundays
 Dame Edna: Back with a Vengeance
 Mario Cantone: Laugh Whore
 Whoopi: The 20th Anniversary Show

Regional Theatre Tony Award
 Theatre de la Jeune Lune

Lifetime Achievement in the Theatre
 Edward Albee

Tony Honors for Excellence in Theatre
Peter Neufeld
Theatre Communications Group

Multiple nominations and awards

These productions had multiple nominations:

14 nominations: Monty Python's Spamalot 
11 nominations: Dirty Rotten Scoundrels and The Light in the Piazza
8 nominations: Doubt  
6 nominations: Glengarry Glen Ross, The Pillowman, The 25th Annual Putnam County Spelling Bee and Who's Afraid of Virginia Woolf?  
5 nominations: Chitty Chitty Bang Bang and Gem of the Ocean 
4 nominations: La Cage aux Folles and Pacific Overtures  
3 nominations: A Streetcar Named Desire, Sweet Charity and Twelve Angry Men 
2 nominations: On Golden Pond and The Rivals  

The following productions received multiple awards.

6 wins: The Light in the Piazza
4 wins: Doubt 
3 wins: Monty Python's Spamalot
2 wins: Glengarry Glen Ross, La Cage aux Folles, The Pillowman and The 25th Annual Putnam County Spelling Bee

See also
 Drama Desk Awards
 2005 Laurence Olivier Awards – equivalent awards for West End theatre productions
 Obie Award
 New York Drama Critics' Circle
 Theatre World Award
 Lucille Lortel Awards

References

External links
 The Official Website of the Tony Awards

Tony Awards ceremonies
2005 theatre awards
Tony
2005 in New York City
2000s in Manhattan
Television shows directed by Glenn Weiss